Alexandra Vaksvik Koefoed (born 25 March 1978) is a Norwegian sailor. She was born in Oslo, and has represented the Royal Norwegian Yacht Club. She competed at the 2008 Summer Olympics, where she placed ninth in the Yngling class, together with Siren Sundby and Lise Birgitte Fredriksen.

References

External links

Norwegian female sailors (sport)
1978 births
Living people
Sportspeople from Oslo
Sailors at the 2008 Summer Olympics – Yngling
Olympic sailors of Norway